Susan Valerie McCready (born 4 April 1981 in Sunbury, Victoria) is an Australian sport shooter. Since 1997, McCready had won a total of eleven medals (five golds, four silver, and two bronze) in both air and small-bore rifle at the Oceania Shooting Championships. She also captured a gold medal in the women's 50 m rifle three positions at the 1998 Commonwealth Games in Kuala Lumpur, Malaysia, accumulating a score of 667.3 points. McCready is the wife of three-time Olympian (2004, 2008, and 2012) and pistol shooter Daniel Repacholi.

McCready made her official debut for the 2000 Summer Olympics in Sydney, where she placed fifteenth in the 10 m air rifle, and twentieth in the 50 m rifle 3 positions, with total scores of 392 and 574 points, respectively.

At the 2004 Summer Olympics in Athens, McCready finished twenty-seventh in the preliminary rounds of the women's 10 m air rifle, with a total score of 391 points, tying her position with four other shooters including South Korea's Seo Sun-hwa. She also accumulated a score of 567 targets (194 in a prone position, 187 in standing, and 186 in kneeling) in her second event, 50 m rifle 3 positions, by two points behind Japan's Hiromi Misaki, finishing only in twenty-fifth place.

Eight years after competing in her first Olympics, McCready qualified for her third Australian team, as a 27-year-old, at the 2008 Summer Olympics in Beijing, by finishing second in the air rifle (AR40) from the 2007 Oceanian Shooting Championships in Sydney. She placed forty-second in the women's 10 m air rifle by one point ahead of Venezuela's Diliana Mendez from the final attempt, with a total score of 386 points. Nearly a week later, McCready competed for her second event, 50 m rifle 3 positions, where she was able to shoot 195 targets in a prone position, 172 in standing, and 183 in kneeling, for a total score of 550 points, finishing only in forty-third place.

Olympic results

References

External links
Profile – Australian Olympic Team
NBC 2008 Olympics profile

Australian female sport shooters
Living people
Olympic shooters of Australia
Shooters at the 2000 Summer Olympics
Shooters at the 2004 Summer Olympics
Shooters at the 2008 Summer Olympics
Sportswomen from Victoria (Australia)
1981 births
Commonwealth Games gold medallists for Australia
Commonwealth Games medallists in shooting
Shooters at the 1998 Commonwealth Games
20th-century Australian women
21st-century Australian women
People from Sunbury, Victoria
Medallists at the 1998 Commonwealth Games
Medallists at the 2002 Commonwealth Games